All Together Now was an Australian sitcom that was broadcast on Nine Network between 1991 and 1993. The premise involved an aging rocker, played by Jon English trying to maintain his music career while living with his son and daughter.  For an undetermined number of initial episodes filmed prior to public broadcast, the show title was "Rhythm and Blues" and had a different theme song.

Cast
 Jon English as "Bobby Rivers"
 Rebecca Gibney as "Tracy Lawson" (Eps 1–86)
 Steven Jacobs as "Thomas Sumner"
 Jane Hall as "Anna Sumner"
 Garry Who as "Doug Stevens" (Eps 1–76)
 Bruno Lucia as "Wayne Lovett"
 Kerry Armstrong as "Beth Sumner" (Eps 85–101)

Awards
At the 1992 Logie Awards, the show and its actors were nominated for four awards: 
 The show (Most Popular Light Entertainment/Comedy Program)
 Rebecca Gibney (Most Popular Actress, and Most Popular Light Entertainment/Comedy Female Performer)
 Jon English (Most Popular Light Entertainment/Comedy Male Performer)

The show was also nominated at the 1993 Logie Awards, again for Most Popular Comedy Program, as was Jon English for Most Popular Comedy Personality.

Home Media
Series 2 is still currently available on DVD and The Complete Series is available on Umbrella Streaming Service and Amazon Prime Video

See also
 List of Nine Network programs
 List of Australian television series

References

External links
 

Australian television sitcoms
Nine Network original programming
Television shows set in Melbourne
1991 Australian television series debuts
1993 Australian television series endings